The Panama International Piano Competition is held at the Teatro Nacional in Panama City every two years. It was established in 2004 by Jaime and Nelly Ingram. The 7th Competition is scheduled to take place in October 2016. Award winners receive cash prizes. Additional special prizes are available for the best performance of one of the first two Sonatas composed by Alberto Ginastera, best performance of a Brazilian composition, and best performance of a work composed by Joaquín Rodrigo.

Prize winners and jurors

Asterisk (*) denotes winner of Audience Choice Award

External links
Official website

References

Panamanian music
Piano competitions